The 1844 United States presidential election in Mississippi took place between November 1 and December 4, 1844, as part of the 1844 United States presidential election. Voters chose six representatives, or electors to the Electoral College, who voted for President and Vice President.

Mississippi voted for the Democratic candidate, James K. Polk, over Whig candidate Henry Clay. Polk won Mississippi by a margin of 14.86%.

Results

References

Mississippi
1844
1844 Mississippi elections